The Penn State Nittany Lions field hockey team is the intercollegiate field hockey program representing Pennsylvania State University. The school competes in the Big Ten Conference in Division I of the National Collegiate Athletic Association (NCAA), although it was also previously a member of the Atlantic 10 Conference (A-10). The Penn State field hockey team plays its home games at the Penn State Field Hockey Complex on the university campus in State College, Pennsylvania. The Nittany Lions captured the Association for Intercollegiate Athletics for Women (AIAW) national championship twice, in 1980 and 1981, and have won 10 regular-season conference titles as well as eight conference tournament championships. While Penn State has qualified for the NCAA tournament 30 times, and has made seven appearances in the semifinals and two in the championship game, it has never won the NCAA national championship. The team is currently coached by Charlene Morett.

History 
Field hockey has been a varsity sport at Penn State since 1964. In 1980 and 1981, the Nittany Lions won back-to-back Association for Intercollegiate Athletics for Women (AIAW) national championships. Penn State played in the Atlantic 10 Conference (A-10) between 1988 and 1990, and has been a member of the Big Ten Conference since 1992. The team has won 10 regular-season conference titles (three in the A-10 and seven in the Big Ten) as well as eight conference tournament championships (two in the A-10 and six in the Big Ten). The Nittany Lions have appeared in the NCAA tournament 30 times, including seven appearances in the semifinals and two in the championship game, but have never won the NCAA national championship. Penn State is currently coached by Charlene Morett, who is in her 28th season as the program's head coach. Before Morett's tenure began in 1987, the Nittany Lions had previously been coached by Pat Seni (1964–68), Nancy Bailey (1969), Tonya Toole (1970–73), and Gillian Rattray (1974–86).

Season-by-season results 

Season-by-season results through the end of the 2022 season

Awards and accolades

National championships
Before the advent of NCAA field hockey, Penn State won two AIAW national championships, in 1980 and 1981. Since the NCAA has sanctioned field hockey, the Nittany Lions have appeared in the NCAA tournament 30 times, including seven appearances in the semifinals and two in the championship game, although they have never won the NCAA national championship.

Conference championships
Penn State has won 10 conference titles, three in the Atlantic 10 Conference (A-10) and seven in the Big Ten Conference.

National Player of the Year winners

All-Americans

Olympians

Individual honors through the end of the 2014 season

Stadium 

Penn State has played its home games at the Penn State Field Hockey Complex since its opening in 2005. The complex has a seating capacity of 750, and boasts an advanced field watering system as well as floodlights that allow for the playing of night games. Built adjacent to Bigler Field, the former home of the Nittany Lions field hockey program, the Penn State Field Hockey Complex has witnessed success both on the field and in the stands; in both 2005 and 2006, Penn State did not lose a home game all season, while in 2006 the school finished fifth in the country in home attendance (2006 was the first year that the NCAA kept attendance statistics for field hockey). Before the Nittany Lions field hockey team moved to the complex in 2005, it had previously played at four other venues: Pollock Field (1964–75), Lady Lion Field (1976–88), Holuba Hall (1989–95), and Bigler Field (1996–2004).

See also
List of NCAA Division I field hockey programs

References

External links